The Department of Education is a government department in Victoria, Australia.

Formerly known as the Department of Education and Early Childhood Development until January 2015 and Department of Education and Training (DET) until January 2023, the department is responsible for the state's education system. Until January 2023, the department was also responsible for TAFE, training and higher education until these functions were transferred to the  Department of Jobs, Skills, Industry and Regions.

Ministers
, the department supports two ministers in the following portfolios:

Functions 
The department has responsibility for the following policy areas:
 Early childhood development
 Primary education
 Secondary education

Agencies
Agencies under the DE's portfolios include:

See also 
 VELS
 Victorian Certificate of Education
 Victorian Certificate of Applied Learning
 Victorian Curriculum and Assessment Authority
 Ultranet (product)
 Special Assistance Program
 Safe Schools Coalition Australia#Victoria

References 

Education in Victoria (Australia)
Education
Funding bodies of Australia
Victoria